Yann Kerboriou (born 5 February 1988) is a French footballer who plays for FCM Aubervilliers.

References

French footballers
1988 births
Living people
Ligue 2 players
Championnat National players
Championnat National 2 players
Championnat National 3 players
US Créteil-Lusitanos players
FC Fleury 91 players
FCM Aubervilliers players
Association football goalkeepers